Hans Brunhart (born 28 March 1945) is a political figure from Liechtenstein. Brunhart served as the head of government of Liechtenstein from 1978 to 1993.

Prime Minister of Liechtenstein
Brunhart was the Deputy Prime Minister of Liechtenstein from 1974 to 1978, and the head of government, foreign minister and finance minister of the principality of Liechtenstein from 26 April 1978 until 26 May 1993. He was a member of the Patriotic Union, a liberal oriented party. He resigned after his party received disappointing results in the 1993 election.

Later activities
Since 1996, Brunhart has been chairman of the board of directors of Verwaltungs- und Privat Bank AG, Vaduz.

See also
 Politics of Liechtenstein

References

1945 births
Living people
Heads of government of Liechtenstein
Deputy Prime Ministers of Liechtenstein
Patriotic Union (Liechtenstein) politicians